Hugh O. Nourse and Carol Nourse are botanical photographers and authors. Hugh is a retired professor of economics in the Terry College of Business at the University of Georgia, where the MBA Professor of the Year Award has been renamed in his honor.

Partial bibliography

Botanical
Wildflowers of Georgia  By Hugh O. Nourse, Carol Nourse; 2000 University of Georgia Press 
The State Botanical Garden of Georgia By Carol Nourse, Hugh O. Nourse; 2001 University of Georgia Press 
Favorite Wildflower Walks in Georgia By Hugh O. Nourse, Carol Nourse; 2007 University of Georgia Press 
Field guide to the rare plants of Georgia By Linda G. Chafin, Jean C. Putnam Hancock, Hugh Nourse, Carol Nourse; 2007 University of Georgia Press 
Guide to the Natural Environments of Georgia, edited by Leslie Edwards, Jonathan Ambrose, L. Katherine Kirkman, and James Renner, photographs by Hugh and Carol Nourse, expected 2012, University of Georgia Press

Economic
Regional economics; a study in the economic structure, stability, and growth of regions, Hugh O Nourse; 1968 OCLC 261608

References

Living people
American photographers
Botanical illustrators
Nature photographers
University of Georgia faculty
Married couples
Year of birth missing (living people)